Skin Deep is the 14th studio album by blues musician Buddy Guy, released in 2008.
The album features a number of collaborations including: Eric Clapton, Derek Trucks, Susan Tedeschi, and Robert Randolph.

Background
Buddy Guy said he was inspired to write the song "Skin Deep" after reuniting with a white childhood friend whose parents had cut off their relationship as teens. He has also stated that the inspiration came from his mother who used to tell him that 'beauty is only skin deep.'

Reception

People magazine praised Guy's guitar work saying that there was "...no doubt that Buddy is still the man here." CD Universe did much the same by writing "...he wails and shreds here with as much passion as ever." and "...Guy still plays and sings like the urban blues monster he remains." Allmusic criticized the production for being too pristine, saying that the album "gleams too brightly" in some parts.  The album received a Grammy nomination for Best Traditional Blues Album. The album debuted at number 68 on the Billboard 200, the highest position of any of Guy's previous albums.  It also debuted at number 1 on the Blues Albums chart and remained at the top spot for three weeks and remained on the chart for 65 weeks.

Track listing

Charts

Personnel

Musicians
Buddy Guy - guitar, sitar, vocals

Guitars

'57 Stratocaster on track 1
Jerry Jones sitar on tracks 2 & 9
Gibson ES-335 Custom on track 3
'74 Telecaster on tracks 4 & 8
BG Stratocaster on tracks 5, 7, 10 & 11
Gibson Custom 335 on track 6
Eric Clapton Stratocaster on track 12
Marc Franklin - trumpet
David Grissom - guitar
Tom Hambridge - drums, handclaps, tambourine, percussion, vocals, backing vocals
Richie Hayward - drums
Rob McNelly - guitar
Quinn Sullivan - guitar
Willie Weeks - bass
Nathan Williams - accordion
Reese Wynans - keyboards
Lannie McMillan - tenor saxophone
Kirk Smothers - tenor saxophone
Bekka Bramlett, Bonnie Bramlett & Wendy Moten - backing vocals

Guest musicians
Eric Clapton - guitar, vocals
Robert Randolph - steel guitar, pedal steel
Susan Tedeschi - vocals
Derek Trucks - slide guitar, guitar

References 

2008 albums
Buddy Guy albums
Jive Records albums
Albums produced by Tom Hambridge